Simply Nothing is the debut album by singer-songwriter Shawn McDonald on Sparrow Records released August 10, 2004.

Track listing

Track information
Take My Hand
 Acoustic Guitar: Shawn McDonald
 Acoustic Bass: Mark Schneider
 Cello: Dale Bradley
 Programming: Christopher Stevens
 Background Vocals: Shawn McDonald
 Written by Shawn McDonald and Paul Wright

Gravity
 Acoustic Guitar: Shawn McDonald
 Acoustic Bass: Mark Schneider
 Cello: Dale Bradley
 Electric Guitar: Joe Weber, Nathan Christenson
 Programming: Rhodes
 Additional Guitars: Christopher Stevens
 Background Vocals: Shawn McDonald
 Written by Shawn McDonald and Christopher Stevens

Hold On
 Acoustic Guitar: Shawn McDonald
 Viola, Nylon Guitar: Roy Brewer
 Bass, Programming: Christopher Stevens
 Background Vocals: Shawn McDonald
 Written by Shawn McDonald and Christopher Stevens

Simply Nothing
 Acoustic Guitar: Shawn McDonald
 Drums, Bass, Additional Guitars, Programming: Christopher Stevens
 Background Vocals: Cara Flory,  Shawn McDonald
 Written by Shawn McDonald

Beautiful
 Acoustic Guitar: Shawn McDonald
 Cello: Dale Bradley
 Viola: Roy Brewer
 Programming: Christopher Stevens
 Background Vocals: Cara Flory
 Written by Shawn McDonald

Don't Walk Away
 Acoustic Guitar: Shawn McDonald
 Drums: Tim Donahue
 Electric/Acoustic Bass: Mark Schneider
 Programming: Christopher Stevens
 Written by Shawn McDonald

All I Need
 Acoustic Guitar: Shawn McDonald
 Drums: Tim Donahue
 Programming, Bass, Electric Guitars: Christopher Stevens
 Background Vocals: Cara Flory, Shawn McDonald
 Written by Shawn McDonald

Take This Life
 Spanish Guitar: Roy Brewer
 Bass, Programming: Christopher Stevens
 Background Vocals: Jessica Rossi
 Written by Shawn McDonald and Christopher Stevens

 Have You Ever?
 Acoustic Guitar: Shawn McDonald
 Programming: Christopher Stevens
 Written by Shawn McDonald

 Here I Am
 Acoustic Guitar: Shawn McDonald
 Cello: Dale Bradley
 Programming: Christopher Stevens
 Background Vocals: Cara Flory
 Written by Shawn McDonald

 Yahweh
 Acoustic Guitar: Shawn McDonald
 Drums: Tim Donahue
 Bass, Programming: Christopher Stevens
 Written by Shawn McDonald

 Open Me
 Acoustic Guitar: Shawn McDonald
 Drums: Tim Donahue
 Acoustic Bass: Mark Schneider
 Cello: Dale Bradley
 Programming: Christopher Stevens
 Background Vocals: Jessica Rossi
 Written by Shawn McDonald

Album credits
 Produced, Engineer & Mixed by Christopher Stevens
 Executive Producer: Christopher York
 Recorded & Mixed at fabmusic, Springfield, OR
 Mastered by Jim DeMain at Yes Master
 Creative Director: Jan Cook
 Photography: Jeremy Cowart / Pixelgrazer.com
 Photography Art Direction: Joshua S. Newman
 Design: Jeremy Cowart / Pixelgrazer.com
 Design Art Direction: Tim Frank
 Grooming: Glynne Davies

Shawn McDonald albums
2004 debut albums
Sparrow Records albums